The Titan IIID or Titan 3D was an American expendable launch system, part of the Titan rocket family. Titan IIID was flown 22 times with KH-9 and KH-11 satellites between 1971 and 1982, all successful launches. Essentially a Titan IIIC with the Transstage removed, it was designed for heavy LEO payloads.

The Titan IIID first flew on 15 June 1971, launching the first KH-9 satellite. It was retired from service in 1982, and replaced by the uprated Titan 34D. All launches occurred from Space Launch Complex 4E at Vandenberg Air Force Base.

Launch history

References

External links

Titan (rocket family)
Military equipment introduced in the 1970s